The Battle of Mesothen took place from 26-30 September to 1 October 1812, between the Russian Corps of Finland and the French-allied Prussian Auxiliary Corps. It was fought near the Latvian town of Mežotne, then part of the Courland Governorate.

Background
In September 1812, Russian troops of General Steinheil entered Mitau, Gross Eckau and Bauska without a fight. However, they were spread out and vulnerable to enemy counterattacks. The Prussian command deployed its forces to defend the artillery stationed at the Bauska Castle and sent small squads to the ford across the river Lielupe.

Battle

On September 29, the Prussians launched a counterattack against the advancing Russian forces and attacked their vanguard at 5 pm. The struggle lasted until late at night and pushed the Russian troops back. On the same night, Ludwig von Yorck sent forces under the command of Friedrich Kleist against the troops of Alexander Belgard, which were chasing a retreating Prussian squad on the left bank of the Lielupe. The resulting battle was fought in darkness and involved only infantry units. Vastly outnumbering the enemy, the Prussians forced the Russian troops back and, after having received substantial reinforcements, went on the offensive.

Aftermath

As a result of the battle, Steinheil called off the advance and returned to Riga. Although a defeat, the battle eased some of the pressure on the Russian army of Peter Wittgenstein, helping it to eventually capture the city of Polotsk on October 20.

See also
List of battles of the French invasion of Russia

Notes

References

External links
 

Battles of the French invasion of Russia
Battles of the Napoleonic Wars
Battles involving Russia
Battles involving Prussia
Conflicts in 1812
September 1812 events
1812 in Prussia
1812 in the Russian Empire